Onychostoma elongatum is a species of cyprinid in the genus Onychostoma.

References

elongatum
Cyprinid fish of Asia
Fish of Laos
Fish of Vietnam
Fish described in 1934